Germanium sulfide can refer to
 Germanium(IV) sulfide GeS2, also known as Germanium disulfide
 Germanium(II) sulfide GeS, a semiconductor also known as Germanium monosulfide